The Purakaunui River is a river in the western Catlins, New Zealand. It rises west of Houipapa and flows through the Pūrākaunui Bay Scenic Reserve into the Pacific Ocean at Pūrākaunui Bay. The river is best known for Purakaunui Falls.

See also
List of rivers of New Zealand

References

Rivers of Otago
Rivers of New Zealand